This is the complete list of World Aquatics Championships medalists in diving from 1973 to 2022.

Men

Bold numbers in brackets denotes record number of victories in corresponding disciplines.

1 metre springboard

Medals:

3 metre springboard

Medals:

10 metre platform

Medals:

Synchronized 3 metre springboard

Medals:

Synchronized 10 metre platform

Medals:

Women

Bold numbers in brackets denotes record number of victories in corresponding disciplines.

1 metre springboard

Medals:

3 metre springboard

Medals:

10 metre platform

Medals:

Synchronized 3 metre springboard

Medals:

Synchronized 10 metre platform

Medals:

Mixed

Bold numbers in brackets denotes record number of victories in corresponding disciplines.

Synchronized 3 metre springboard

Medals:

Synchronized 10 metre platform

Medals:

Team

Medals:

All-time medal table 1973–2022
Updated after the 2022 World Aquatics Championships.

Multiple medalists

Boldface denotes active divers and highest medal count among all divers (including these who not included in these tables) per type.

Men

Women

References

External links
 FINA official web site
 Diving / World Championships
 WORLD SWIMMING CHAMPIONSHIPS (1973-2005) at Gbrathletics.com

medalists
Diving
Lists of acrobatic divers